This is a list of Canadian literary figures, including poets, novelists, children's writers, essayists, and scholars.



A

B

C

D

E

F

G

H

I

J

K

L

M

N

O

P

Q

R

S

T

U

V

W

X

Y

Z

See also
 List of Canadian poets
 List of Canadian playwrights
 List of Canadian short story writers
 List of Canadian science fiction authors
 List of Canadian historians
 List of Canadian women writers in French
 List of Quebec writers
 List of French Canadian writers from outside Quebec
 List of famous Canadians
 Lists of authors

Further reading

External links
Introduction - Canadian Writers - Library and Archives Canada
 Canadian Writers - Athabasca University

 
Writers
Canada